Montorio is a municipality and town located in the province of Burgos, Castile and León, north-central Spain. According to the 2009 data from INE, the municipality has a population of 200 inhabitants.

References

Municipalities in the Province of Burgos